Cynthia Menard (born 2000) is a Canadian beauty pageant titleholder who won the Miss World Canada 2017 contest and represented Canada at Miss World 2017.

Pageantry
Menard was crowned Miss World Canada 2017. On November 18, 2017, Menard represented Canada at Miss World 2017 in Sanya, China but Unplaced.

References

External links
 

2000 births
Living people
2017 in China
Actresses from Ottawa
Canadian television actresses
Miss World Canada winners
Canadian beauty pageant winners
Female models from Ontario
Miss World 2017 delegates